13th National Board of Review Awards
December 20, 1941
The 13th National Board of Review Awards were given on 20 December 1941.

Best American Films
Citizen Kane
How Green Was My Valley
The Little Foxes
The Stars Look Down
Dumbo
High Sierra
Here Comes Mr. Jordan
Tom, Dick and Harry
Road to Zanzibar
The Lady Eve

Winners
Best Documentary: Target for Tonight
Best Foreign Film: Pépé le Moko (1937), France
Best Picture: Citizen Kane
Best Acting:
Sara Allgood - How Green Was My Valley
Mary Astor - The Great Lie and The Maltese Falcon
Ingrid Bergman - Rage in Heaven
Humphrey Bogart - High Sierra and The Maltese Falcon
Patricia Collinge - The Little Foxes
Gary Cooper - Sergeant York
George Coulouris - Citizen Kane
Donald Crisp - How Green Was My Valley
Bing Crosby - Road to Zanzibar and Birth of the Blues
Bette Davis - The Little Foxes
Isobel Elsom - Ladies in Retirement
Joan Fontaine - Suspicion
Greta Garbo - Two-Faced Woman
James Gleason - Meet John Doe and Here Comes Mr. Jordan
Walter Huston - All That Money Can Buy (aka The Devil and Daniel Webster)
Ida Lupino - High Sierra and Ladies in Retirement
Roddy McDowall - How Green Was My Valley
Robert Montgomery - Here Comes Mr. Jordan and Rage in Heaven
Ginger Rogers - Kitty Foyle and Tom, Dick and Harry
James Stephenson - The Letter and Shining Victory
Orson Welles - Citizen Kane

Notes

External links
National Board of Review of Motion Pictures :: Awards for 1941

1941 film awards
1941
1941 in American cinema